The Swedish Wood Workers' Union (Trä) was a trade union representing wood workers in Sweden.

The union was founded in 1889 as the Wood Workers' Union of Sweden, and had 880 members by the end of the year.  It grew rapidly, and although the Swedish Building Wood Workers' Union split away in 1904, it rejoined in 1916.  The union affiliated to the Swedish Trade Union Confederation, and by 1923, it had 16,177 members.  The following year, it was split into the Swedish Wood Industry Workers' Union, and a new Swedish Building Wood Workers' Union.

Presidents
1889: Rasmus Hansen
1894: Herman Lindqvist
1900: Sven Persson
1904: Arvid Thorborg
1908: Nils Linde

References

Swedish Trade Union Confederation
Carpenters' trade unions
Trade unions in Sweden
Trade unions established in 1889
Trade unions disestablished in 1924